Children of Nobody is a South Korean television series produced by Mega Monster for MBC, starring Kim Sun-a, Lee Yi-kyung, Nam Gyu-ri and Cha Hak-yeon. It aired on MBC TV every Wednesday and Thursday at 22:00 KST for 32 episodes, from November 21, 2018 to January 16, 2019.

Synopsis

Cha Woo Kyung is a child counselor who works at a children’s center. Her life seems perfect since she is married to a great husband and is pregnant. However, her perfect life doesn't last long, when an accident changes her life. She then meets Kang Ji Hun, violent crimes unit  detective, who is hurt for hiding his troubling past but is strict toward criminals and believes they should be punished to the full extent.

Cast

Main
 Kim Sun-a as Cha Woo-kyung
 A child psychologist who winds up in a strange car accident. She stumbles upon a mysterious child and embarks on a quest for the truth, using poetry as clues. 
 Lee Yi-kyung as Kang Ji-hyun
 A police detective who has a good sense of judgement and a natural instinct for crime-solving, he believes in sticking to the basics and that all sins must be judged in the court of law.
 Nam Gyu-ri as Jeon Soo-young
 A new recruit in Ji-heon's department. She is deemed a mysterious woman due to her emotions and actions.
 Cha Hak-yeon as Lee Eun-ho
 An introverted individual who works at the childcare center where Woo-kyung works. He loves children and becomes much brighter, happier and energetic around them.

Supporting

People related to Cha Woo-kyung
 Kim Young-jae as Kim Min-suk
 Woo-kyung's husband
 Na Young-hee as Heo Jin-ok
 Woo-kyung's mother
 Oh Hye-won as Cha Se-kyung
 Woo-kyung's sister
 Joo Ye-rim as Kim Eun-seo
 Woo-kyung and Min-suk's daughter

Hanul Children's Center people
  as Song Ho-min
  as Yoon Tae-joo
 TBA as Song Jae-hak

Police officers
 Park Soo-young as Chief Hong Gi-tae
  as Kwon Chan-wook

Others
 Ha Eun-soo as Lee Yeon-joo
 Ji-heon's ex-girlfriend, who later became Min-suk's mistress.
 Kim Kang-hoon as Han Si-wan
 One of the children sheltered at Haneul Center, who has a traumatic past.
 Yoo Eun-mi as Lee Bit Na.
 Kang Mal-geum as Si-wan's mother
 Kim Ji-eun as Min-joo
 Moon Ye-won as Choi Mi-sun

Special appearances
 Ha Joo-hee as Park Ji-hye
 An ex-convict who killed her own child. Due to the incident she received hate upon completing her jail sentence. She was later found dead, burned inside a car.

Production
A few days before the premiere, MBC announced that Kang Hee-joo (Hide and Seek) will co-direct the series.
 The series is produced for MBC by Mega Monster, a company jointly owned by Kakao M (formerly LOEN Entertainment), KakaoPage, and Studio Dragon.
 Script reading for the series was held in October 2018 at the MBC broadcasting center in Sangam-dong, Seoul.
 The series used some parts of the poem Leper by Seo Jeong-ju.

Original soundtrack

Part 1

Part 2

Part 3

Part 4

Part 5

Part 6

Ratings

Awards and nominations

International broadcast
 In Hong Kong, Indonesia, Malaysia, Singapore and Brunei, the series airs on Oh!K TV within 24 hours after the Korean broadcast since November 22, 2018.
 In Canada, the series airs on All TV.
 In Myanmar, the series is broadcast by 5PLUS.
 In Japan, the series was aired on DATV, and later on by LaLa TV.
 The series is available for streaming via:
 POOQ and iMBC VOD in South Korea,
 Viki, KOCOWA TV, Viu, and OnDemandKorea worldwide,
 KKTV in Taiwan.
 UNTV This 2020 in Philippines

Notes

References

External links
 
 
Children of Nobody | Korea | Drama | Watch with English Subtitles & More ✔️

MBC TV television dramas
2018 South Korean television series debuts
2019 South Korean television series endings
Korean-language television shows
South Korean mystery television series
South Korean thriller television series
Child abuse in television
Television shows written by Do Hyun-jung
Television series by Mega Monster